Edwin Orlando Mosquera Roa (26 July 1985 – 2 December 2017) was a Colombian weightlifter who competed in the 69 kg division. He won silver medals at the 2007 Pan American Games and 2016 Pan American Championships, and won the Pan American Championships in 2008 and 2010. He placed 7th at the 2016 Olympics, but had to withdraw from the 2008 Games due to a kneecap injury.

Mosquera died on 2 December 2017, after being shot twice.

References

1985 births
2017 deaths
Colombian male weightlifters
Colombian murder victims
Olympic weightlifters of Colombia
Weightlifters at the 2008 Summer Olympics
Weightlifters at the 2016 Summer Olympics
Weightlifters at the 2007 Pan American Games
Sportspeople from Chocó Department
Pan American Games silver medalists for Colombia
Pan American Games medalists in weightlifting
Deaths by firearm in Colombia
Male murder victims
People murdered in Colombia
Medalists at the 2007 Pan American Games
Pan American Weightlifting Championships medalists
20th-century Colombian people
21st-century Colombian people